The 1989 Arkansas Razorbacks baseball team represented the University of Arkansas in the 1989 NCAA Division I baseball season. The Razorbacks were coached by Norm DeBriyn, in his 20th season with the Razorbacks, and played their home games at George Cole Field.

Schedule and results

Razorbacks in the 1989 MLB Draft
The following members of the Arkansas Razorbacks baseball program were drafted in the 1989 Major League Baseball Draft.

References

Arkansas
Arkansas Razorbacks baseball seasons
Arkansas Razorbacks baseball
College World Series seasons